General elections were held in the Federation of Malaya on Wednesday, 19 August 1959 for members of the first Parliament of the Federation of Malaya, the first parliamentary election in Malaya. It was the third national-wide election held in Malaya since the end of World War II. Malaya later formed Malaysia with three other states in 1963. Voting took place in all 104 parliamentary constituencies of Malaya, each electing one Member of Parliament to the Dewan Rakyat, the dominant house of Parliament. Voter turnout was 73%.

In the election, the Alliance Party – later Barisan Nasional – emerged as the victor. The party was a coalition formed by United Malays National Organisation, Malayan Chinese Association and Malayan Indian Congress. The coalition won 74 out of 104 seats in the Dewan Rakyat with only 51.8% of total votes. The opposition as a whole garnered 30 seats with 48.3% of total votes.

The 71.1% majority allowed Alliance Party to form a government as sanctioned by the Constitution of Malaya.

When results were announced on the morning of 20 August, only 103 seats were returned as elections in the Kedah Tengah (Central Kedah) constituency was delayed until 30 September. The Alliance proceeded to win this seat with Khir Johari as the winning candidate.

Prior to the parliamentary election, state elections took place in all 282 state constituencies in 11 states of Malaya from 20 May to 24 June 1959, each electing one Member to the State Legislative Assembly, the Dewan Undangan Negeri. As a result, PAS took over the administration of Terengganu and Kelantan but served only 2 terms before being retaken by Alliance. 

Three Alliance candidates contested unopposed

Timelines

Dewan Rakyat
Nomination Date : 15 July 1959 
Election day : 19 August 1959

State legislative assemblies

Results

By state

Johore

Kedah

Kelantan

Malacca

Negeri Sembilan

Pahang

Penang

Perak

Perlis

Selangor

Trengganu

State Assemblies

References

External links
Documentary video about the 1959 elections Government of Malaysia (in Malay)

General elections in Malaysia
Malaya
General
Political history of Malaya